Cyrillus Xavier Martyn (born 14 March 1908) was a Sri Lankan Tamil politician and Member of Parliament.

Martyn was born on 14 March 1908.

Martyn stood as the Illankai Tamil Arasu Kachchi's (Federal Party) candidate in Jaffna at the 1965 parliamentary election but was defeated by the All Ceylon Tamil Congress candidate G. G. Ponnambalam. He was ITAK's candidate in the constituency at the 1970 parliamentary election. He won the election and entered Parliament. He was expelled from ITAK in 1971 for supporting the new republican constitution.

Martyn contested the 1977 parliamentary election as an independent candidate but was defeated by the Tamil United Liberation Front candidate V. Yogeswaran. Martyn was a Roman Catholic.

References

1908 births
Illankai Tamil Arasu Kachchi politicians
Members of the 7th Parliament of Ceylon
People from Northern Province, Sri Lanka
People from British Ceylon
Sri Lankan Roman Catholics
Sri Lankan Tamil politicians
Year of death missing